The 1964 Minnesota Golden Gophers baseball team represented the University of Minnesota in the 1964 NCAA University Division baseball season. The Golden Gophers played their home games at Delta Field. The team was coached by Dick Siebert in his 17th season at Minnesota.

The Golden Gophers won the College World Series, defeating the Missouri Tigers in the championship game.

Roster

Schedule 

! style="background:#FFBC3A;color:#872434;"| Regular Season
|- valign="top" 

|- align="center" bgcolor="#ffdddd"
| March 23 || at  || 4-5 || 0-1 || –
|- align="center" bgcolor="#ffdddd"
| March 23 || vs.  || 1-6 || 0-2 || –
|- align="center" bgcolor="#ffdddd"
| March 24 || at Texas || 4-8 || 0-3 || –
|- align="center" bgcolor="#ddffdd"
| March 24 || vs. Texas Lutheran || 12-3 || 1-3 || –
|- align="center" bgcolor="#ffdddd"
| March 25 || at Texas A&M || 2-7 || 1-4 || –
|- align="center" bgcolor="#ffdddd"
| March 25 || vs. Lackland Air Force Base || 0-3 || 1-5 || –
|- align="center" bgcolor="#ffdddd"
| March 26 || vs. Texas A&M || 2-3 || 1-6 || –
|- align="center" bgcolor="#ddffdd"
| March 26 || vs.  || 7-2 || 2-6 || –
|- align="center" bgcolor="#ffdddd"
| March 27 || vs.  || 8-6 || 2-7 || –
|- align="center" bgcolor="#ddffdd"
| March 27 || vs. Randolph Air Force Base || 8-6 || 3-7 || –
|- align="center" bgcolor="#ffdddd"
| March 28 || vs. Lackland Air Force Base || 1-6 || 3-8 || –
|-

|- align="center" bgcolor="#ddffdd"
| April 10 ||  || 5-0 || 4-8 || –
|- align="center" bgcolor="#ddffdd"
| April 10 || North Dakota State || 6-0 || 5-8 || –
|- align="center" bgcolor="#ddffdd"
| April 11 ||  || 5-0 || 6-8 || –
|- align="center" bgcolor="#ddffdd"
| April 11 || St. Thomas || 5-3 || 7-8 || –
|- align="center" bgcolor="#ddffdd"
| April 15 ||  || 7-0 || 8-8 || –
|- align="center" bgcolor="#ddffdd"
| April 17 ||  || 17-6 || 9-8 || –
|- align="center" bgcolor="#ddffdd"
| April 17 || Northern Iowa || 18-0 || 10-8 || –
|- align="center" bgcolor="#ddffdd"
| April 18 ||  || 5-0 || 11-8 || –
|- align="center" bgcolor="#ddffdd"
| April 18 || South Dakota State || 2-1 || 12-8 || –
|- align="center" bgcolor="#ddffdd"
| April 22 ||  || 8-0 || 13-8 || –
|- align="center" bgcolor="#ddffdd"
| April 22 || Luther || 4-1 || 14-8 || –
|- align="center" bgcolor="#ffdddd"
| April 24 || at  || 2-3 || 14-9 || 0-1
|- align="center" bgcolor="#ddffdd"
| April 25 || at  || 4-2 || 15-9 || 1-1
|- align="center" bgcolor="#ddffdd"
| April 25 || at Illinois || 6-2 || 16-9 || 2-1
|-

|- align="center" bgcolor="#ddffdd"
| May 1 ||  || 9-2 || 17-9 || 3-1
|- align="center" bgcolor="#ddffdd"
| May 2 || Iowa || 4-0 || 18-9 || 4-1
|- align="center" bgcolor="#ddffdd"
| May 2 || Iowa || 2-0 || 19-9 || 5-1
|- align="center" bgcolor="#ddffdd"
| May 9 ||  || 4-1 || 20-9 || 6-1
|- align="center" bgcolor="#ddffdd"
| May 9 || Michigan State || 7-4 || 21-9 || 7-1
|- align="center" bgcolor="#ddffdd"
| May 15 || at  || 8-6 || 22-9 || 8-1
|- align="center" bgcolor="#ffdddd"
| May 16 || at  || 3-4 || 22-10 || 8-2
|- align="center" bgcolor="#ffdddd"
| May 16 || at Ohio State || 2-3 || 22-11 || 8-3
|- align="center" bgcolor="#ddffdd"
| May 22 ||  || 3-0 || 23-11 || 9-3
|- align="center" bgcolor="#ddffdd"
| May 23 ||  || 1-0 || 24-11 || 10-3
|- align="center" bgcolor="#ddffdd"
| May 23 || Wisconsin || 7-1 || 25-11 || 11-3
|-

|-
! style="background:#FFBC3A;color:#872434;"| Post-Season
|-
|-

|- align="center" bgcolor="#ddffdd"
| May 29 || vs.  || 7-4 || 26-11
|- align="center" bgcolor="#ddffdd"
| May 30 || vs. Kent State || 13-2 || 27-11
|-

|- align="center" bgcolor="ddffdd"
| June 8 || vs. Texas A&M || Rosenblatt Stadium || 7-3 || 28-11
|- align="center" bgcolor="ddffdd"
| June 12 || vs.  || Rosenblatt Stadium || 12-0 || 29-11
|- align="center" bgcolor="ddffdd"
| June 13 || vs. Southern California || Rosenblatt Stadium || 6-5 || 30-11
|- align="center" bgcolor="ffdddd"
| June 15 || vs. Missouri || Rosenblatt Stadium || 1-4 || 30-12
|- align="center" bgcolor="ddffdd"
| June 17 || vs. Missouri || Rosenblatt Stadium || 5-1 || 31-12
|-

Awards and honors 
Bill Davis
 All College World Series Team

Dave Hoffman
 All-College World Series Team

Dewey Markus
 All-College World Series Team

Joe Pollack
 All-Big Ten First Team
 All-College World Series Team

Ron Wojciak
 All-America First Team
 All-Big Ten First Team
 All-College World Series Team

References 

Minnesota
Minnesota Golden Gophers baseball seasons
College World Series seasons
NCAA Division I Baseball Championship seasons
Big Ten Conference baseball champion seasons
Golden Go